The Hôtel Pullman Paris Tour Eiffel is skyscraper hotel located near the Eiffel Tower in the 15th arrondissement of Paris, France. It has 430 rooms. It is one of the closest hotels to the Eiffel Tower.

History
The Paris Hilton was designed by architect Pierre Dufau and was formally opened on April 21, 1966 by Conrad Hilton and French Minister of Tourism Pierre Dumas.The 462-room hotel was constructed at a cost of 80 million Francs and was the 67th Hilton property. 

It became a Pullman hotel in 2009 and joined the AccorHotels group. In 2014, the hotel was renovated with the designer Christophe Pillet.

The hotel is owned by Amundi.

See also 
 Skyscraper
 List of tallest structures in Paris

References

External links 
 Official website

Paris Tour Eiffel Hotel
Hotel buildings completed in 1966
Hotels established in 1966
Skyscraper hotels in France
Skyscrapers in Paris
Buildings and structures in the 15th arrondissement of Paris